The Hoggar Mountains (Berber: idurar n Ahaggar) are a highland region in the central Sahara in southern Algeria, along the Tropic of Cancer. The mountains cover an area of approximately 550,000 km.

Geography

The mountains are primarily composed of metamorphic rock approximately 2 billion years old, although there are areas where more recent volcanic activity has laid down much newer rock. Several of the more dramatic peaks, such as Ilamen, are the result of erosion wearing away extinct volcano domes, leaving behind the more resistant material that plugged the volcanic cones.

Assekrem is a famous and often visited point where Charles de Foucauld built a hermitage in 1911. The main city near the Hoggar Mountains is Tamanrasset, built in a desert valley or wadi.

Environment
The Hoggar Mountain range typically experiences hot summers, with a cold winter climate. Temperatures fall below freezing in the winter. Rainfall is rare and sporadic year-round. However, since the climate is less extreme than in most other areas of the Sahara, the Hoggar Mountains are a major location for biodiversity, including number of relict species. The Hoggar Mountains are part of the West Saharan montane xeric woodlands ecoregion.

The Hoggar mountains are home to the Ahaggar National Park, one of the national parks of the country.

Fauna and flora
Slightly to the west of the Hoggar range, a population of the endangered African wild dog (Lycaon pictus) remained viable into the 20th century, but is now thought to be extirpated within this entire region.

Analysis of collected scat in 2006 showed the presence of the Northwest African cheetah in the region. Between August 2008 and November 2010, four individuals were recorded by camera traps.

Relict populations of the West African crocodile persisted in the Hoggar Mountains until the early 20th century.

The park also contains a population of herbivores such as the saharan subspecies of the barbary sheep and the Dorcas gazelle.

Vegetation in this area includes trees such as Vachellia tortilis, Vachellia seyal, myrtle and Tamarix aphylla which are scattered throughout the area. Other plants may include Citrullus colocynthis and Calotropis procera.

Cultural significance
Prehistoric settlement is evident from extant rock paintings dating to 6000 BC. The Hoggar Massif is the land of the Kel Ahaggar Tuareg. The tomb of Tin Hinan, the woman believed to be the matriarch of the Tuareg, is located at Abalessa, an oasis near Tamanrasset.

The hermitage of Charles de Foucauld, which continues to be inhabited by a few Catholic monks, is at the top of the Assekrem plateau in the Hoggar Mountains.

Panoramic view

See also
France and weapons of mass destruction; Saharan facilities
Saharan rock art
Teffedest Mountains

References

Further reading

External links

 A website about the park
Park data on UNEP-WPMC
Ahaggar National Park - The Biodiverse Home of the Saharan Cheetah

National parks of Algeria
Mountain ranges of Algeria
Saharan rock art
Sahara
Tuareg
Geography of Tamanrasset Province
Volcanoes of Algeria
Tourist attractions in Tamanrasset Province